Lecture Notes may refer to the following book series, published by Springer Science+Business Media

 Lecture Notes in Computer Science
 Lecture Notes in Mathematics
 Lecture Notes in Physics